Kripps is a surname. Notable people with the surname include:

Agnes Kripps (1925–2014), Canadian politician
Justin Kripps (born 1987), Canadian bobsledder

See also
Krips